Olli (Olof) Kiukkonen Kinkkonen (June 10, 1880 – September 18, 1918) was a Finnish-American dockworker and logger. He was lynched in Duluth, Minnesota on September 18, 1918, for renouncing his American citizenship because he wanted to avoid fighting in World War I.

Death 

Shortly before the lynching, Kinkkonen and five others renounced their rights to U.S. citizenship, because they did not want to fight in World War I. A small mob calling itself the "Knights of Loyalty" formed and went searching for him. They found him in his boarding house, preparing to return to Finland. He was taken to Congdon Park where he was tarred and feathered. The local newspaper received a letter saying that Kinkkonen had been tarred and feathered to serve as "a warning to all slackers", a term used for men who refused to join the military. His body was found two weeks later hanging from a tree outside Duluth in Lester Park. 
 
Duluth authorities declared his death a suicide, triggered by his humiliation at the event. His alleged murderers were never charged. Kinkkonen was buried in an unmarked grave in the indigent section of Park Hill Cemetery in Duluth, a few rows from where the victims of the 1920 Duluth lynchings would later be buried. In 1993, the Finnish-American cultural society, Työmies, placed a marker on Kinkkonen's grave. It reads:

See also

 Robert Prager, a German immigrant lynched in Illinois in 1918 for being a suspected socialist

References 

1918 in Minnesota
Lynching deaths in Minnesota
1918 deaths
Events in Duluth, Minnesota
Finnish-American history
Hate crimes
United States home front during World War I
September 1918 events
1918 murders in the United States
Tarring and feathering in the United States